A Mhya..A Mhya... is a 2019 Burmese horror drama film, directed by Steel (Dwe Myittar) starring Khant Si Thu, Eaindra Kyaw Zin and Lin Zarni Zaw. It was produced by R Square Films and premiered in Myanmar on October 3, 2019.

Cast
Khant Si Thu as Nway Oo
Eaindra Kyaw Zin as Moe Ma Kha
Chit Snow (child actress) as Saung Hay Man
Yoon May (child actress) as Snow White
Lin Zarni Zaw

References

2019 films
2010s Burmese-language films
Burmese horror films
Films shot in Myanmar